Do Piran may refer to:
 Do Piran, Gotvand
 Do Piran, Ramhormoz